John Henry Hall (3 July 1883 – 20 February 1949) was an English professional footballer who played more than 200 games in the Football League as an inside forward or centre forward.

Career
Hall was born in Hucknall, Nottinghamshire. After trials with Nottingham Forest and Mansfield Town, he turned professional with Stoke in October 1904. He played more than 50 games in the Football League, scoring 18 goals before joining Brighton & Hove Albion in 1906. He was their leading scorer in the two seasons he spent with the club, with 28 and 26 goals respectively in all competitions. In all domestic league competitions, he scored 38 goals from 67 games in the Southern League, 6 from 9 in the United League, and 5 from 7 in the Western League.

In April 1908, Hall signed for Middlesbrough for a £700 fee. At the time, there was a £350 cap on transfer fees, so clubs evaded the problem by including a second player as a makeweight in the deal, valuing him at the difference between £350 and the fee required. The makeweight in this case was Harry Kent, a centre-half who played only six times for Middlesbrough before returning to the Southern League with Watford. Middlesbrough were nevertheless fined £100 over the transaction, as Hall's Football League registration was still held by Stoke. Hall was Middlesbrough's top scorer in both the seasons with that club, in 1908–09 and 1909–10.

After a brief spell with Leicester Fosse he moved to Birmingham, where he was yet again his club's leading scorer in his first two seasons, 1910–11 (despite not joining the club until December 1910) and 1911–12. After retiring from football, Hall became the landlord of The Small Heath Tavern in Birmingham, where he remained until his death in 1949.

Career statistics
Source:

References

1883 births
People from Hucknall
Footballers from Nottinghamshire
1949 deaths
English footballers
Association football forwards
Stoke City F.C. players
Middlesbrough F.C. players
Brighton & Hove Albion F.C. players
Leicester City F.C. players
Birmingham City F.C. players
English Football League players
Southern Football League players